Mikaela Marie Javier Quintos (born December 18, 1997), also known as Mikee Quintos, is a Filipino actress and singer. She is best known for her role as Lira in Encantadia.

Life and career 
Quintos was born in Manila, Philippines. Both her parents are politicians. She began singing publicly at the age of seven for her parents' political campaign. She has three sisters: Loisa, Denise and Jodee. She is currently taking architecture at the University of Santo Tomas. Quintos is discovered through YouTube. She bagged the role of Lira (originally played by Jennylyn Mercado), daughter of Amihan in the phenomenal fantaserye, Encantadia, and is considered her breakout role.

Filmography

Television

Accolades

References

External links 
 
 Sparkle profile

1997 births
Living people
21st-century Filipino singers
Actresses from Manila
Filipino women comedians
Filipino television actresses
People from Sampaloc, Manila
Singers from Manila
Tagalog people
GMA Network personalities